is one of Japan's top makers of fibers and textiles, including synthetic fibers (polyester, nylon and acrylics) and natural fibers, such as cotton and wool.

History 

Toyobo was established in 1882 by Eiichi Shibusawa as a cotton-spinning company in a context of post-Meiji Restoration. By the 1930s, Toyobo was the world's largest cotton-spinning company. In the 1960s, the company started to manufacture synthetic fibers and films.

In August 2013, Toyobo bought the Spanish company Spinreact for 22.3 million euros.

In 2015, Toyobo provided 40% of the yarn for airbags worldwide, and 50% of Japan's food packaging films. In March 2017, Toyobo introduced Cocomi, a t-shirt that tracks a driver's heartbeats and activates an alarm if somnolence is detected. In August 2017, Toyobo established a new group in Europe, Toyobo Chemicals Europe GmbH, with a focus on marketing specialty chemical products, and a new manufacturing base for airbag fabrics.

In March 2018, Toyobo paid $66 million to settle a case of defective bulletproof vests sold to the US Government between 2001 and 2005.

Activities 

Toyobo's textiles are designed for clothing, home furnishings, and for industrial uses. Textiles include spandex yarn for apparel, polyurethane fiber for pantyhose, yarns for airbags and tire cords and synthetic fibers for apparel. Toyobo is also engaged in the spinning, weaving, knitting, dyeing, sewing, and the wholesaling and trading of textiles in Japan and internationally.

Toyobo also manufactures plastic films, and resins. Biochemical products such as reagents, medical products (e.g. fiber membranes for artificial organs), and purification devices are also manufactured by the company.

The company operates across Japan, China, South Korea, Singapore, Malaysia, Australia, United States, and Germany and is listed on the Tokyo Stock Exchange, being a component of the Nikkei 225 stock index.

Gallery

See also

Biodefense

References

External links
 Official global website 

Textile companies of Japan
Defense companies of Japan
Chemical companies of Japan
Clothing companies of Japan
Disaster preparedness
Medical technology companies of Japan
Manufacturing companies based in Osaka
Japanese companies established in 1882
Manufacturing companies established in 1882
Companies listed on the Tokyo Stock Exchange
Japanese brands